The 1999 Oklahoma tornado outbreak was a significant tornado outbreak that affected much of the Central and parts of the Eastern United States, with the highest record-breaking wind speeds of .  During this week-long event, 154 tornadoes touched down (including one in Canada).  More than half of them were on May 3 and 4 when activity reached its peak over Oklahoma, Kansas, Nebraska, Texas, and Arkansas.

The most significant tornado first touched down southwest of Chickasha, Oklahoma, and became an F5 before dissipating near Midwest City. The tornado tore through southern and eastern parts of Oklahoma City and its suburbs of Bridge Creek, Moore, Del City, Tinker Air Force Base and Midwest City, killing 36 people, destroying more than 8,000 homes, and causing $1.5 billion in damage. With a total of 72 tornadoes, it was the most prolific tornado outbreak in Oklahoma history, although not the deadliest.

Meteorological synopsis

The outbreak was caused by a vigorous upper-level trough that moved into the Central and Southern Plains states on the morning of May 3. That morning, low stratus clouds overspread much of Oklahoma, with clear skies along and west of a dry line located from Gage to Childress, Texas. Air temperatures at 7:00 a.m. Central Daylight Time ranged in the mid to upper 60s °F (upper 10s to near 20 °C) across the region, while dew point values ranged in the low to mid 60s °F (mid to upper 10s °C). The Storm Prediction Center (SPC) in Norman, Oklahoma, a division of the National Weather Service, initially issued a slight risk of severe thunderstorms early that morning stretching from the Kansas-Nebraska border to parts of southern Texas, with an intended threat of large hail, damaging winds and tornadoes.

By late morning, the low cloud cover began to dissipate in advance of the dry line, but during the afternoon hours high cirrus clouds overspread the region, resulting in filtered sunshine in some areas that caused atmospheric destabilization. The sunshine and heating, combined with abundant low-level moisture, combined to produce a very unstable air mass. Upper air balloon soundings observed strong directional wind shear, cooling temperatures at high atmospheric levels, and the increased potential of CAPE values potentially exceeding 4000 J/kg, levels that are considered favorable for supercells and tornadoes.

As observations and forecasts began to indicate an increasing likelihood of widespread severe weather conditions even more favorable for strong tornadoes, the SPC issued a moderate risk of severe weather at 11:15 a.m. CDT for portions of Kansas, Oklahoma and Texas along and near the Interstate 40 corridor. By 3:00 p.m. CDT, it had become evident that a widespread severe weather event was imminent; the Storm Prediction Center upgraded locations within the moderate risk area to a high risk of severe weather around 4:00 p.m. CDT as wind shear profiles, combined with volatile atmospheric conditions, had made conditions highly conducive for a significant tornadic event across most of Oklahoma, southern Kansas and north Texas, including the likelihood of violent, damaging tornadoes. The SPC issued a tornado watch by mid-afternoon as conditions gathered together for what would be a historic tornado outbreak. By the time thunderstorms began developing in the late-afternoon hours, CAPE values over the region had reached to near 6,000 J/kg. Large supercell thunderstorms developed, and in the late afternoon through the mid-evening hours of that Monday, tornadoes began to break out across the state.

Confirmed tornadoes

 Note: The above amount refers to the rest of the outbreak, not just the ones confirmed in Oklahoma.

Bridge Creek–Moore, Oklahoma

At approximately 3:30 p.m. CDT, a severe thunderstorm began forming in Tillman County in southwestern Oklahoma; a severe thunderstorm warning was issued for this storm by the National Weather Service Weather Forecast Office in Norman at 4:15 p.m. CDT. The storm quickly developed supercell characteristics and began exhibiting potentially tornadic rotation, resulting in the National Weather Service issuing the first tornado warning of the event for Comanche, Caddo and Grady counties approximately 35 minutes later at 4:50 p.m. CDT.

This large tornado had exhibited a companion satellite tornado for a few minutes.

The storm produced the most significant tornado of the outbreak, which touched down just southwest of the Grady County community of Amber at 6:23 p.m. CDT and headed northeast, parallel to Interstate 44, just after another tornado had passed over the airport in Chickasha. The storm continued moving northeast, destroying the community of Bridge Creek and crossing I-44 just north of Newcastle. The tornado then crossed the Canadian River, passing into far southern Oklahoma City. These winds, however, occurred above the ground, and winds at the surface may not have been quite this intense. The tornado continued on into Moore, then passed over the intersection of Shields Boulevard and Interstate 35 and back into Oklahoma City, crossing Interstate 240 near Bryant Avenue. The storm then turned more northerly, striking parts of Del City and Tinker Air Force Base near Sooner Road as an F4. The storm damaged and/or destroyed several businesses, homes and churches in Midwest City. Some damage in this area was rated as high-end F4, although F5 was considered. The tornado diminished over Midwest City and finally lifted near the intersection of Reno Avenue and Woodcrest Drive.

Thirty-six people died in this tornado, and over 8,000 homes were badly damaged or destroyed. The tornado caused $1 billion in damage, making it the second-costliest tornado in U.S. history, and the most costly in history from 1999 to 2011, at which point it was surpassed by the 2011 Tuscaloosa–Birmingham tornado and again by the 2011 Joplin tornado. It was also the deadliest tornado to hit the U.S. since the April 10, 1979 F4 tornado that hit Wichita Falls, Texas, which killed 42 people.

Cimarron City–Mulhall–Perry, Oklahoma

Late in the evening on May 3 at 9:25 p.m. This wedge tornado, which tracked a  path, was very wide and at times exceeded one mile (1.6 km) in width. According to storm chasing meteorologist Roger Edwards, it may have been as violent or more than the F5 Bridge Creek–Moore tornado (however, it was officially rated as an F4).

A Doppler On Wheels (DOW) mobile radar observed this tornado as it crossed Mulhall. The DOW measured a complex multi-vortex structure, with several vortices containing winds of up to  rotating around the tornado. The 3D structure of the tornado has been analyzed in a 2005 article in the Journal of the Atmospheric Sciences by Wen-Chau Lee and Joshua Wurman. The tornado severely damaged or destroyed approximately 60–70% of the 130 homes in Mulhall, destroying the Mulhall/Orlando Elementary School and toppling the city's water tower.

After the tornado dissipated at approximately 10:45 p.m. CDT. Damage caused by this tornado was indistinguishable from damage caused by the earlier F4 tornado. 25 homes were destroyed and 30 others were damaged near Crescent, with much of the damage believed to have been caused by both tornadoes.

Stroud, Oklahoma

At 10:10 p.m. Scattered damage of high-end F0 to low-end F1 intensity occurred to some homes and businesses on the southeast side of Davenport, though a house located just south of town lost more than half of its roof. As the tornado continued to track northeast, parallel with Interstate 44 and State Highway 66, Stroud took a direct hit as the storm intensified to F2 strength; the trucking terminal of the Sygma food distribution warehouse on the west side of town was destroyed with some girders and siding from the warehouse thrown northwest across State Highway 66, and the Stroud Municipal Hospital suffered significant roof damage, which resulted in significant water damage within the building. The most severe damage, consistent with an F3 tornado, occurred at the Tanger Outlet Mall at 10:39 p.m. CDT with almost all of the stores suffering roof damage at minimum, though sections of seven storefronts were destroyed and the exterior walls of the Levi's store were collapsed inward. The mall was evacuated in advance of the tornado, resulting in no injuries or loss of life in the building. CDT.

While there were no fatalities overall in Stroud, the economic impact of the tornado has been compared to the loss of Tinker Air Force Base, General Motors, and a major regional hospital for the Stroud region as compared to Oklahoma City at that time. Approximately 800 jobs were lost in a community of approximately 3,400 people due to the damage of the Sygma distribution warehouse and Tanger Outlet Mall, neither of which were rebuilt. Stroud's recovery was later complicated by the September 11, 2001, terrorist attacks, although the town has since recovered as a result of higher oil and gas prices. Local leading industries include Service King, an oilfield manufacturing facility, and Mint Turbines, a helicopter engine reconditioning facility. Stroud is also now a downloading facility location for oil produced in the northern United States into the Cushing pipeline network.

Other tornadoes
The May 3 tornado event was part of a three-day event that included tornadoes in the states of Kansas, Texas and Tennessee. Other fatalities during the event included one person killed in Texas on May 4 by an F3 tornado that tracked  from near Winfield, Texas, to southwest of Mineral Springs, Arkansas, and three people killed in Tennessee on May 5 and 6 by an F4 tornado that struck the town of Linden.

Non-tornadic events
Flash flooding killed one person in Camden County, Missouri, on May 4. On May 6, lightning struck and killed a man in Cobbtown, Georgia.

Aftermath

Disaster assistance

On May 3–4, the day after the initial outbreak event, President Bill Clinton signed a federal disaster declaration for eleven Oklahoma counties. In a press statement by the Federal Emergency Management Agency (FEMA), then-director James Lee Witt stated that "The President is deeply concerned about the tragic loss of life and destruction caused by these devastating storms." The American Red Cross opened ten shelters overnight, housing 1,600 people immediately following the disaster, decreasing to 500 people by May 5. On May 5, several emergency response and damage assessment teams from FEMA were deployed to the region. The United States Department of Defense deployed the 249th Engineering Battalion and placed the U.S. Army Corps of Engineers on standby for assistance. Medical and mortuary teams were also sent by the U.S. Department of Health and Human Services. By May 6, donation centers and phone banks were being established to create funds for victims of the tornadoes. Within the first few days of the disaster declaration, relief funds were sent to families requesting aid. Roughly $180,000 had been approved by FEMA for disaster housing assistance by May 9.

Debris removal began on May 12 as seven cleanup teams were sent to the region with more teams expected to join over the following days. That day, FEMA also granted seven Oklahoma counties (Canadian, Craig, Grady, Lincoln, Logan, Noble and Oklahoma) eligibility for federal financial assistance. Roughly $1.6 million in disaster funds had been approved for housing and businesses loans by May 13, increasing to more than $5.9 million over the following five days. Applications for federal aid continued through June, with state aid approvals reaching $54 million on June 3. According to FEMA, more than 9,500 Oklahoma residents applied for federal aid during the allocated period in the wake of the tornadoes, including 3,800 in Oklahoma County and 3,757 in Cleveland County. Disaster recovery aid for the tornadoes totaled to roughly $67.8 million by July 2.

Concerns with using overpasses as storm shelters

From a meteorological and safety standpoint, the tornado called into question the use of highway overpasses as shelters from tornadoes. Prior to the events on May 3, 1999, videos of people taking shelter in overpasses during tornadoes in the past (such as an infamous video from the April 26, 1991 tornado outbreak taken by a news crew from Wichita NBC affiliate KSNW) created public misunderstanding and complacency that overpasses provided adequate shelter from tornadoes. Although meteorologists had questioned the safety of these structures for nearly 20 years, there had been no evidence supporting incidents involving loss of life. Three overpasses were directly struck by tornadoes during the May 3 outbreak, resulting in fatalities at each location. Two occurred as a result of the Bridge Creek–Moore F5, while the third occurred in rural Payne County, which was struck by an F2 tornado. According to a study by the National Oceanic and Atmospheric Administration, seeking shelter in an overpass "is to become a stationary target for flying debris"; the wind channeling effect that occurs within these structures along with an increase in wind speeds above ground level, changing of wind direction when the tornado vortex passes, and the fact most overpasses do not have girders for people to take shelter between also provide little to no protection.

See also

Climate of Oklahoma City
List of North American tornadoes and tornado outbreaks
Tornado outbreak of April 28–30, 1960
Ultimate Tornado (documentary)

References

External links
May 3, 1999 Oklahoma Tornado Special Report - The Oklahoman
Great Plains Outbreak of 1999 Tornado History Project
The Great Plains Tornado Outbreak of May 3-4, 1999 (National Weather Service, Norman, Oklahoma)
The 3 May 1999 Oklahoma Tornadoes (David Schultz, CIMMS)
Google Maps' location of Stroud, Oklahoma, with the bulldozed lot of the former Tanger Outlet Mall in the upper left of the screen, just north of Interstate 44
May 3 Oklahoma Tornado Special video section from KOCO-TV
Moore, Oklahoma Tornado Photos, May 1999 Aerial Photos of Moore Oklahoma taken three days after the May 3, 1999, tornado

F5 tornadoes
Tornadoes of 1999
Tornadoes in Kansas
Tornadoes in Oklahoma
Tornadoes in Texas
Natural disasters in Oklahoma
Tornadoes in Tennessee
Tornado outbreaks
1999 in Tennessee
1999 in Texas
1999 natural disasters in the United States
Articles needing additional references from March 2008
May 1999 events in the United States